Seyoon Kim (born 30 September 1946) is a biblical scholar, associate dean for the Korean Doctor of Ministry program and professor of New Testament at Fuller Theological Seminary.

Biography
He was born in Chonbuk, South Korea, and was educated at the University of Tübingen and the University of Manchester. He specializes in Jesus studies, Pauline studies, New Testament Christology, Jesus and Paul. He studied with F. F. Bruce.

Contribution
Seyoon Kim is best known for The Origin of Paul's Gospel, in which he argues that all of Paul's identity and theology come from his experience on the Damascus Road. For example, when Jesus said, "Saul, Saul, why do you persecute me?", the way Jesus identifies with his people leads to the idea of union with Christ.

Selected works

Thesis

Books 
  - Revision of the author's 1977 Ph.D. thesis
 
 
 
 
 
 
 
 
 
 
 
  - revision of the original by F. F. Bruce

References

External links
 Faculty Page
 CV

Alumni of the University of Manchester
New Testament scholars
American theologians
Living people
Fuller Theological Seminary faculty
South Korean emigrants to the United States
University of Tübingen alumni
American biblical scholars
1946 births